John Plympton  (born by 1514  died 1555/1558), of Wincanton, Somerset and Shaftesbury, Dorset, was an English Member of Parliament.

Family
Plympton is thought to have been a son of John Plympton and his wife, Edith. Plympton married Cecily Mayo, a daughter of Robert Mayo of Dinton, Wiltshire, with whom he had two sons and a daughter. She survived him and went on to marry Nicholas Swanton.

Career
He was a Member (MP) of the Parliament of England for Shaftesbury in November 1554.

References

1550s deaths
English MPs 1554–1555
People from Shaftesbury
People from Wincanton
Year of birth uncertain